Rubus multispinus is uncommon North American species of brambles in the rose family. It grows in the northeastern United States (Maine, Rhode Island, Massachusetts, Connecticut).

The genetics of Rubus is extremely complex, so that it is difficult to decide on which groups should be recognized as species. There are many rare species with limited ranges such as this. Further study is suggested to clarify the taxonomy.

References

multispinus
Plants described in 1907
Flora of the Northeastern United States
Flora without expected TNC conservation status